Elisa Delle Piane (27 March 1925 – 25 August 2008) was a Uruguayan human rights activist and politician, a member of the Broad Front. She was married to journalist and politician Zelmar Michelini.

Biography
Elisa Delle Piane was born in Montevideo on 27 March 1925. She married Zelmar Michelini and the couple had ten children, including senator Rafael Michelini and human rights lawyer Felipe Michelini.

She was among the earliest members of the Broad Front and was president of the national pro-referendum commission in Uruguay.

She also dabbled in politics, was a substitute senator, and sat on the same bench as Zelmar Michelini.

Elisa Delle Piane died in Parque del Plata on 25 August 2008, at age 83.

References

1925 births
2008 deaths
20th-century Uruguayan women politicians
20th-century Uruguayan politicians
21st-century Uruguayan women politicians
21st-century Uruguayan politicians
Broad Front (Uruguay) politicians
Members of the Senate of Uruguay
Politicians from Montevideo
Uruguayan human rights activists
Uruguayan people of Italian descent